Derek Pyke (born 7th November 1959) is an English former rugby union and professional rugby league footballer who played in the 1970s, 1980s and 1990s.

Background
Derek Pyke's birth was registered in Leigh, Lancashire, England.

Playing career
Pyke started his career in rugby union, where he was an England schoolboys international, before switching codes and joining Leigh.

In January 1988, Pyke was signed by Widnes in exchange for former Great Britain captain Harry Pinner, and £50,000. He played 66 games for Widnes, and also played in the team that won the 1989 World Club Challenge.

In 1990, Pyke was transferred from Widnes to Oldham for £50,000, but suffered a serious knee injury after playing only five matches for the club. After failing to make a full recovery from the injury, Pyke announced his retirement at the end of the 1991–92 season.

References

External links
Profile at rugby.widnes.tv
Statistics at orl-heritagetrust.org.uk
Search for "Derek Pyke" at britishnewspaperarchive.co.uk

 

1959 births
Living people
English rugby league players
English rugby union players
Lancashire rugby league team players
Leigh Leopards captains
Leigh Leopards players
Oldham R.L.F.C. players
Rugby league players from Leigh, Greater Manchester
Rugby league props
Rugby union players from Leigh, Greater Manchester
Widnes Vikings players